Kekri is a town in kekri district of the Indian state of Rajasthan. It is situated at a distance of about 90 km from the city of Ajmer. Kekri was made a district on March 17 2023, this city used to come in Ajmer district earlier.

Geography 
Kekri is centrally situated among Rajasthan's major cities, Ajmer (80 km), Jodhpur (250 km), Pali (180 km), Bhilwara (100 km), Beawer (90) and India.

History 

A municipality was established at Kekri in 1879.

Temples 

In the village of Para, an ancient temple of Lord Shiva is situated.

The Jain Temple of Sri Shantinath Bhagwan is located in the village of Baghera Digamber.

It has many other temples such as Charbhuja Mandir, Bijasan Mata Mandir, Shantinath Ji Digambar Jain Mandir, Laxminath Ji Mandir, Shiv Mandir, Kekradheesh Mandir, and Mehandipur Balaji Mandir. There is an ancient temple of Lord Devnarayan in the Nayagaon of Meena, 12 km from the area of Kekri, where a huge fair is held every year on Bhadrapad Shukla Saptami.

Economy 

It is mainly an industrial area, including the Agricultural Mandi (Market Yard), oil mills, woolen yarn mill, and some other industries.

The main water source is Bisalpur Dam. Rajasthan's largest water treatment plant is connected with Bisalpur Dam.
A dam in Para called Para 1 Dam is among the major irrigation dams in Ajmer District.

Education 
Kekri has government senior secondary schools, a government college, and other English and Hindi medium private colleges and schools. The Government PG College offers M.A. in History and Political Science. There are upto 50 primary school in city and 7 colleges of various course.

Politics 
At a state level, Kekri falls within the Kekri assembly constituency. As of 2018, its representative in the Vidhan Sabha is Raghu Sharma of the Indian National Congress.

At a national level, the city is falls within the Ajmer Lok Sabha constituency. As of 2019, its Member of Parliament is Bhagirath Choudhary of the Bharatiya Janata Party.

See also
Gordha
Sawar

References 

Cities and towns in Ajmer district
Kekri